XHEFG-FM is a radio station on 89.1 FM in Celaya, in the Mexican state of Guanajuato. It is owned by TVR Comunicaciones and carries the La Mejor grupera format from MVS Radio.

History
XEFG-AM received its concession on April 21, 1963. It was owned by Sergio Olivares Gascón and broadcast on 840 kHz. Known for a time as Radio Juventud, the station donated the first transmitter for the new XEITC-AM in the late 1970s — the first radio station ever owned by a technological institute in Mexico.

In 2011, XEFG was approved to migrate to FM.

References

Radio stations in Guanajuato